Omaka Cemetery (also known as Blenheim Omaka Public Cemetery) is a historic cemetery in Blenheim, New Zealand founded in the 1850s. It consists of over 10,000 burials and is the largest cemetery in Marlborough due to its proximity to the region's capitol. The cemetery closed for burials during the later half of the 1970s but was reopened in 2011. The cemetery consists of three separate lawns numbered one to three with lawns one and two being established in the mid-nineteenth century. Lawn three was established during World War I and was used as a cemetery for returned serviceman but over time became the main cemetery for the Marlborough region. Fairhall Cemetery is now Marlborough's foremost cemetery.

Burials

Notable burials in Lawn One (Old Cemetery) and Lawn Two (Catholic Cemetery) include:
 Kimball Bent (1837–1916), soldier and adventurer who joined the Māori rebellion during the New Zealand Wars
 Arthur Carkeek (1843–1897), New Zealand Cross recipient
 Thomas Carter (1827–1900), third superintendent of Marlborough Province
 Henry Dodson (1828–1892), brewer and early mayor of Blenheim
 William Girling (1882–1973), politician
 Thomas Grace (Archdeacon of Marlborough) (1850-1919), Vicar and Archdeacon of Marlborough. Son of Thomas Grace (missionary)
 Richard McCallum (1863–1940), politician
 Mary Müller (1820–1901), suffragist
 William Gilbert Rees (1827–1898), founder of Queenstown
 James Sinclair (1817–1897), founder of Blenheim

Notable burials in Lawn Three (New Cemetery) include:
 Fen Cresswell (1915–1966), cricketer
 Gunner A. J. Healy (1895–1966), soldier whose arrest in 1917 sparked the Étaples mutiny
 Ted Meachen (1895–1970), politician
 Charles H. Mills (1843–1923), politician
 Edith Rudd (1882–1967), nurse, Florence Nightingale Medal recipient
 Charles Saunders (1902–1994), Olympic rower

References

External links

 Marlborough District council website
 

Cemeteries in New Zealand
1850s establishments in New Zealand
Buildings and structures in Blenheim, New Zealand